Hythe, from Anglo-Saxon hȳð,  may refer to a landing-place, port or haven, either as an element in a toponym, such as Rotherhithe in London, or to:

Places

Australia
 Hythe, Tasmania

Canada
Hythe, Alberta, a village in Canada

England
The Hythe, Essex, part of Colchester
Hythe, Hampshire, a village near Southampton
Hythe, Kent, a small coastal town near Folkestone
Hythe (UK Parliament constituency)
Hythe End, a village, now part of Staines
Egham Hythe, an area near Egham, Surrey
New Hythe, a village in Kent
 Small Hythe,  a hamlet near Tenterden in Kent

 West Hythe, a hamlet near Palmarsh in Kent

Other uses
Short Hythe (a post-war British flying boat)
HMS Hythe (J194)
HMS Hythe (1905), an auxiliary minesweeper which sank in 1915 in the Dardanelles with the loss of 154 lives
 Hythe Venetian Fete, a traditional water carnival

See also 

 Hithe, Kenya
 Folkestone and Hythe (disambiguation)
 Hythe railway station (disambiguation)